Goodenia centralis is a species of flowering plant in the family Goodeniaceae and is endemic to central Australia. It is a prostrate, annual herb with coarsely toothed, spatula-shaped to egg-shaped leaves with the narrower end towards the base, and racemes of yellow flowers with purple veins.

Description

Taxonomy and naming
Goodenia centralis was first formally described in 1980 by Roger Charles Carolin in the journal Telopea from material collected by George Chippendale near Irving Creek in the Petermann Ranges in the Northern Territory in 1958. The specific epithet (centralis) refers to the central Australian habitat.

Distribution and habitat
This goodenia grows in woodland and tussock grassland on sand in the deserts of central-eastern Western Australia, south-western Northern Territory and northern South Australia.

Conservation status
Goodenia centralis is classified as "not threatened" by the Government of Western Australia Department of Parks and Wildlife, and as "least concern" under the Northern Territory Government Territory Parks and Wildlife Conservation Act 1976.

References

centralis
Eudicots of Western Australia
Flora of the Northern Territory
Flora of South Australia
Plants described in 1980
Taxa named by Roger Charles Carolin